Chiang Mai is the largest Province (changwat) of Thailand. It lies in upper northern Thailand and has a population of 1.78 million people. It is bordered by Chiang Rai to the northeast, Lampang and Lamphun to the south, Tak to the southwest, Mae Hong Son to the west, and Shan State of Burma to the north.

Geography
The Mae Ping, one of the major tributaries of the Chao Phraya River, originates in the Daen Lao mountains. Several national parks are in the province: Doi Inthanon, Doi Suthep-Pui, Ob Luang, Sri Lanna, Huai Nam Dang, Mae Wang, and Pha Daeng.

National parks
There are fifteen national parks, make up, region 16 of Thailand's protected areas.
 Si Lanna National Park, 
 Huai Nam Dang National Park, 
 Pha Daeng National Park, 
 Mae Ping National Park, 
 Op Luang National Park, 
 Doi Pha Hom Pok National Park, 
 Doi Inthanon National Park, 
 Mae Tho National Park, 
 Mae Takrai National Park, 
 Doi Wiang Pha National Park, 
 Doi Suthep–Pui National Park, 
 Op Khan National Park, 
 Khun Khan National Park, 
 Mae Wang National Park, 
 Namtok Bua Tong–Namphu Chet Si National Park,

Wildlife sanctuaries
There are four wildlife sanctuaries, make up region 16 of Thailand's protected areas.
 Omkoi Wildlife Sanctuary, 
 Chiang Dao Wildlife Sanctuary, 
 Mae Lao–Mae Sae Wildlife Sanctuary, 
 Samoeng Wildlife Sanctuary,

Climate
Chiang Mai has a tropical wet and dry climate (Köppen Aw), tempered by the low latitude and moderate elevation, with warm to hot weather year-round, though nighttime conditions during the dry season can be cool and are much lower than daytime highs.

History
 

The city of Chiang Mai, the capital of Chiang Mai province, was also capital of the Lanna Kingdom after its founding in 1296, during the same period of time as the establishment of the Sukhothai Kingdom. From then, Chiang Mai not only became the capital and cultural core of the Lanna Kingdom, but also the centre of Buddhism in northern Thailand. King Meng Rai built many temples in the region.

In 1558, Chiang Mai became a colony of the First Toungoo Empire. Chiang Mai remained its colony for more than 200 years, until the Burmese–Siamese War (1775–1776).  In 1774 the Burmese colonial regime were finally driven out of Chiang Mai by a coalition of Lanna and Siamese forces and it then became a tributary state of Siam, which later installed a Lanna chieftain ally, Kawila, to independently rule over Lampang and Chiang Mai region as a monarch.

In the reign of King Rama V of Siam, under his administrative centralization policy and due to the ineptitude of Chiang Mai's ruling family, Chiang Mai eventually lost its independence, was annexed and became a second level subdivision of Siam.

From 1933 on, Chiang Mai received its status as a "province" of Siam and has remained so until the present day.

Demographics
Of the population, 13.4 percent in the province are members of hill tribes:

 Akha the largest population of any hill tribe in the region. Within their villages they build a spirit gateway to protect them from evil spirits.
 Hmong from southern China. Prefer higher elevations. They raise livestock and grow rice, corn, tobacco, and cabbage. Known for their embroidery and silver.
 Karen occupy valleys and riverbanks.
 Lahu from southern China and live in high areas. They are known as hunters and planters.
 Lisu from southern China and Tibet are renowned for their colorful dress and also build their dwellings on high poles. They harvest rice and corn and their men are skilled in hunting.
 Tai Lue live in dwellings of usually only a single room wooden house built on high poles. They are skilled in weaving.
 Tai Yai, Burmese in origin, harvest rice, farm, raise cattle and trade. Their craftsmanship lies in weaving, pottery, wood carving and bronze ware.
 Yao reside on mountainsides and grow corn and other crops. They are skilled blacksmiths, silversmiths and embroiders.

Religion

Symbols
The seal of the province shows a white elephant in a glass pavilion. The white elephant is a royal symbol in Thailand, and it is depicted to remember the offering of a white elephant by Thammalangka, a ruler of Chiang Mai, to his overlord, King Rama II of Bangkok. The pavilion symbolizes that Buddhism prospered in Chiang Mai, especially when in 1477 the teachings of Buddha, the Tripitaka, were reviewed.

The provincial flower and tree is the "flame of the forest" (Butea monosperma).

The provincial slogan is In the shadow of Mount Doi Suthep, blessed with rice customs and traditions, beautiful wild flowers, magnificent Nakhon Phing.

Administrative divisions and postal codes

Chiang Mai is subdivided into 25 districts (amphoe). The districts are further divided into 204 subdistricts (tambon) and 2,066 villages (muban).

 Mueang Chiang Mai: 50000
 Chom Thong: 50160
 Mae Chaem: 50270
 Chiang Dao: 50170
 Doi Saket: 50220
 Mae Taeng: 50150
 Mae Rim: 50180
 Samoeng: 50250
 Fang: 50110
 Mae Ai: 50280
 Phrao: 50190
 San Pa Tong: 50120
 San Kamphaeng: 50130
 San Sai: 50210
 Hang Dong: 50230
 Hot: 50240
 Doi Tao: 50260
 Omkoi: 50310
 Saraphi: 50140
 Wiang Haeng: 50350
 Chai Prakan: 50320
 Mae Wang: 50360
 Mae On: 50130
 Doi Lo: 50160
 Galyani Vadhana: 50270

Local government
As of 26 November 2019 there are: one Chiang Mai Provincial Administration Organisation and 121 municipal (thesaban) areas in the province. Chiang Mai has city (thesaban nakhon) status. Mae Jo, Mae Hia, Mueang Kaen Phatthana and Ton Pao have town (thesaban mueang) status. Further 116 subdistrict municipalities (thesaban tambon). The non-municipal areas are administered by 89 Subdistrict Administrative Organisations - SAO (ongkan borihan suan tambon).

Human achievement index 2017

Since 2003, the United Nations Development Programme (UNDP) in Thailand has tracked progress on human development at sub-national level using the Human Achievement Index (HAI), a composite index covering all the eight key areas of human development. The National Economic and Social Development Board (NESDB) took over this task in 2017.

Transportation

 Road: Chiang Mai is on Highway 11, the only 2-digit road number in the province. Other roads connect the city of Chiang Mai with the north and south of the province, as well as with the east towards Chiang Rai province.
 Train: Chiang Mai railway station is the northern terminus of the Northern Line, operated by the State Railway of Thailand.
 Air: Chiang Mai International Airport (CNX) is one of the seven Thai international airports under the aegis of the Airports of Thailand Public Company Limited (AOT). As Chiang Mai International Airport is the major gateway to northern Thailand, it plays an important role in promoting travel and tourism throughout the northern region. Today, 14 airlines serve the airport and more than 3,000,000 passengers, 15,000 flights, and 16,000 tons of cargo are handled annually.*Songthaew

Tourism 

Chiang Mai province is the tourist hub of the north and one of Thailand's most important tourist destinations. It is considered one of the most scenic provinces in the country due to its mountain ranges, valleys, flora, and fauna. For example, the Hang Dong Canyon is coveted as a great tourist attraction. Furthermore, unlike most of Thailand, in some months, the climate in the north and Chiang Mai is cool, fresh, and misty.

Health 
Each amphoe of Chiang Mai has its own hospital, but among the largest are located in Mueang Chiang Mai District and include Maharaj Nakorn Chiang Mai Hospital and Nakornping Hospital.

Local products 
Chiang Mai is a handicrafts centre, with a variety of antiques, silver jewellery, and embroidery, Thai silks and cottons, basketry, celadon, silverware, furniture, lacquerware, woodcarvings, and parasols.

Local culture 
The north of Thailand's culture is Lanna in origin and the people are proud of their northern roots. The region is home to distinctive foods, music, arts, way of life, and even language. Chiang Mai is home to various hill tribes and their own distinctive cultures.

Local food 

 Nam phrik ong is a type of Nam phrik chili paste which is made of minced pork and tomatoes. It is usually eaten with soft-boiled vegetables, pork crackling, or deep-fried crunchy rice cakes.
 Nam phrik num meaning "chili paste young man", is another kind of paste which can be eaten with pork crackling.
 Sai ua is a local sausage that is very aromatic and spicy and is usually eaten with sticky rice.
 Kaeng meaning "curry", is not made with coconut milk in the north.
 Kaeng hang-le is northern-style pork curry
 Kaeng om is a spicy curry consisting of intestines
 Kaeng khae is a spicy curry consisting mainly of vegetables.
 Khanom chin nam ngiao is a traditional northern noodle dish with chicken or pork.
 Khao soi is a noodle dish which can be made from chicken, pork, or beef made with coconut milk and garnished with chopped fresh shallots, pickled cabbage, chilli paste to taste, and a slice of fresh lime.

Sports 
There are two main sport stadia in Chiang Mai and its environs: 700th Anniversary Stadium and Province Stadium. 700th Anniversary Stadium is on Klongchonpratan Road,  from Chiang Mai University. There are swimming pools, diving pool, basketball arena, and 11 tennis courts.

Sister cities
The province is twinned with eight provinces/states.

  Shanghai, China (2000)
  Yogyakarta, Indonesia  (2007)
  Qingdao, China (2008)
  Chongqing, China (2008)
  Hokkaido, Japan (2013)
  Bursa, Turkey (2013)
  Chiang Tung, Myanmar (2014)
  Chengdu, China (2015)

Notable inhabitants 

 Thaksin Shinawatra (Thai:ทักษิณ ชินวัตร) (born 1949), politician and businessman
 Yingluck Shinawatra (Thai:ยิ่งลักษณ์ ชินวัตร) (born 1967), politician

Gallery

References

External links

 Chiang Mai Creative City Page
 Website of Chiang Mai provincial administration
 Website of Chiang Mai Provincial Administration Organization

 
Provinces of Thailand